A Life Begins is a 2010 Canadian French language drama film, directed and written by Michel Monty, his debut long feature. The film's original working title was Cent milliards de neurones ("One Hundred Billion Neurons").

Plot
Following the death of his doctor father (François Papineau) from an overdose of prescription drugs in the 1960s, 12-year-old Étienne (Charles Antoine Perreault) starts down the same path in an obsessive attempt to both replace and honor his memory.

Cast
 Charles Antoine Perreault: Étienne Langevin (the son)
 François Papineau: Jacques Langevin (father)
 Julie Le Breton: Louise Langevin (mother)
 Raymond Cloutier: Guy Langevin (grandfather)
 Rita Lafontaine: grandmother
 Juliette Vermes-Monty:Marie-Ève
 Mathis Brisson: Martin
 Éliane Préfontaine: Patricia
 Étienne Soucy-Lord: Michel Meilleur
 Yves Sauvé: Michel Monty

Awards
The film received six Jutra Award nominations at the 14th Jutra Awards in 2012, for Best Actor (Perreault), Best Actress (Le Breton), Best Supporting Actor (Papineau), Best Costume Design (Ginette Magny), Best Hair (Martin Lapointe) and Best Makeup (Diane Simard).

References

External links
 

2010 films
2010s French-language films
2010 directorial debut films
Canadian drama films
Quebec films
French-language Canadian films
2010s Canadian films